Vladimir Bubanja (born 2 August 1989) is a Serbian football defender who plays for Novi Pazar.

References

External links
 
 Vladimir Bubanja Stats at utakmica.rs

1989 births
Living people
Sportspeople from Kragujevac
Association football defenders
Serbian footballers
FK Radnički 1923 players
FK Kolubara players
FK Metalac Gornji Milanovac players
FK Zemun players
FC AGMK players
Surkhon Termez players
FK Inđija players
FK Novi Pazar players
Serbian First League players
Serbian SuperLiga players
Uzbekistan Super League players
Serbian expatriate footballers
Expatriate footballers in Uzbekistan
Serbian expatriate sportspeople in Uzbekistan